Shilaroo Hockey Stadium is a multi-purpose stadium in Shilaroo, Himachal Pradesh. The stadium was constructed and maintained by Sports Authority of India and located in Netaji Subhash High Altitude Training Centre, Shilaroo which is 52 km from Shimla.

The stadium is located at an altitude of 8,000 feet and is surrounded by Narkanda and Hatu peak. It is the highest Hockey stadium in the world. The stadium is one of the most modern facilities for hockey like synthetic turf etc. The stadium was opened in 2010 by Sports Minister of India MS Gill.

References

See also 

 Sports Authority of India
 Netaji Subhash High Altitude Training Centre

Field hockey venues in India
Athletics (track and field) venues in India
Multi-purpose stadiums in India
Sports venues in Himachal Pradesh
Sports venues completed in 2010
Buildings and structures in Shimla district
2010 establishments in Himachal Pradesh